Hester v. United States, 265 U.S. 57 (1924), is a decision by the United States Supreme Court, which established the open-fields doctrine. In an opinion written by Justice Oliver Wendell Holmes, the Court held that "the special protection accorded by the Fourth Amendment to the people in their 'persons, houses, papers and effects', is not extended to the open fields."

See also
List of United States Supreme Court cases, volume 265
Katz v. United States (1967)
Oliver v. United States (1984)

References

Further reading

External links
 

United States Supreme Court cases
United States Supreme Court cases of the Taft Court
United States Fourth Amendment case law
1924 in United States case law